Beau Reus (born 31 October 2001) is a Dutch professional footballer who plays as a goalkeeper for Belgian club Beveren.

Career
Born in Oudorp, Reus began playing football with VV Kolping Boys and FC Volendam before joining the AZ youth academy as an under-15 player.

Reus made his professional debut with Jong AZ in a 6–1 Eerste Divisie loss to NAC Breda on 29 August 2020.

On 20 July 2021, Reus signed his first professional contract with AZ until 2023. In addition, he was promoted to the first team from the 2021–22 season.

On 19 July 2022, Reus signed a two-year contract with Beveren in Belgium. He made his debut against Royal Excelsior on 20 August 2022.

References

External links
 Career stats - Voetbal International
 

2001 births
Living people
Footballers from North Holland
Sportspeople from Alkmaar
Dutch footballers
Association football goalkeepers
FC Volendam players
Jong AZ players
AZ Alkmaar players
K.S.K. Beveren players
Eerste Divisie players
Dutch expatriate footballers
Expatriate footballers in Belgium
Dutch expatriate sportspeople in Belgium
S.K. Beveren players